Balıcallı (also, Ballydzhaly and Baladzhali) is a village in the Neftchala Rayon of Azerbaijan.  The village forms part of the municipality of Boyat.

Notable natives 

 Aghashirin Jafarov — Hero of the Soviet Union.

References

External links

Populated places in Neftchala District